Aleksa Simić (Boljevci, March 18, 1800 – Belgrade, March 17, 1872) was a Serbian politician serving as Prime Minister on three terms and Government Minister on multiple terms.

Biography
Simić was a part of  the Ustavobranioci group, known as the Defenders of the Constitution.

Aleksa first came to the Principality of Serbia from Srem, then a Habsburg-occupied territory, in 1819. He was hired as a clerk in the office of Prince Miloš Obrenović. In 1835, Simić becomes the Minister of Finance, and in 1842 he served as Prince Miloš's diplomatic envoy in negotiations with the Ottomans at Constantinople. In 1843 he becomes the Minister of Foreign Affairs of the Principality of Serbia.

His older brother, Stojan Simić, was also a politician and a businessman. Both brothers owed to Miloš Obrenović their rise from humble beginnings to great wealth and power.  His nephew was Đorđe Simić, who held the post of Prime Minister of Serbia.

See also
List of prime ministers of Serbia
 Avram Petronijević
 Toma Vučić-Perišić 
 Dimitrije Davidović
 Ilija Garašanin

External links
 Biography of Aleksa Simić 
 Aleksa Simić, biography.

References

1800 births
1872 deaths
Prime Ministers of Serbia
Finance ministers of Serbia
Government ministers of Serbia
Foreign ministers of Serbia
Education ministers of Serbia
Interior ministers of Serbia
Justice ministers of Serbia